The Quad City Flames were an American professional ice hockey team that played in the American Hockey League from 2007 to 2009.  They were owned by QC Sports Ventures Inc., an ownership group based out of the Quad Cities. The Flames played at the iWireless Center in Moline, Illinois, serving as the top minor league affiliate of the National Hockey League's Calgary Flames. The move to the Quad Cities was confirmed on May 24, 2007. As a result, the arena's previous hockey tenant, the Quad City Mallards of the United Hockey League ceased operations.

The team left the Quad Cities after the 2008–09 season and relocated to Abbotsford, British Columbia to play as the Abbotsford Heat in the 2009–10 season.

History
The Flames AHL franchise relocated from Omaha, Nebraska, where the team spent two seasons as the Omaha Ak-Sar-Ben Knights.  Following two disappointing seasons at the gate in which the Flames and the Knights of Ak-Sar-Ben lost over $4 million, the Flames chose to relocate the franchise. The new franchise joined former UHL rival, the Rockford IceHogs in moving up to the AHL. The Flames made their AHL regular-season debut in Moline on October 6, 2007 with a 5–1 victory over Rockford.

The Flames were the third team to attempt to place an AHL team in the Quad Cities.  Both the San Jose Sharks and Edmonton Oilers were unable to reach an agreement with the owners of the Mallards and of the arena.  While the NHL franchise had signed an affiliation agreement to the end of the 2011–12 season, the Flames and Quad City Sports Ventures agreed to end the agreement after just two seasons and the Flames placed their affiliate in Abbotsford, British Columbia for the 2009–10 AHL season. Local ownership in Quad Cities estimated the team's losses for 2008–09 at $1.3 million.

This market was previously served by:
Quad City Mallards of the UHL (1995–2007)
The market was subsequently home to:
Quad City Mallards of the IHL, CHL, and the ECHL (2009–18)

Affiliates
Calgary Flames (2007–2009)

Season-by-season results

Regular season

Playoffs

Team records

Single season
Goals: 39  Kyle Greentree (2008–09)
Assists: 43  Grant Stevenson (2007–08)
Points: 76  Kyle Greentree (2008–09)
Penalty Minutes: 248  Brandon Prust (2007–08)
GAA: 2.23  Leland Irving (2008–09)
SV%: .912  Matt Keetley (2007–08), Leland Irving (2008–09)
Wins: 24  Leland Irving (2008–09)
Shutouts: 3  Curtis McElhinney (2007–08)

Goaltending records need a minimum 25 games played by the goaltender

Career
Career Goals: 43  Kris Chucko
Career Assists: 76  Carsen Germyn 
Career Points: 108  Carsen Germyn
Career Penalty Minutes: 271  Matt Pelech
Career Goaltending Wins: 24  Leland Irving
Career Shutouts: 3  Curtis McElhinney  Matt Keetley
Career Games: 154  Kris Chucko

References

 
Calgary Flames minor league affiliates
Ice hockey teams in Illinois
Ice hockey clubs established in 2007
Ice hockey clubs disestablished in 2009
2007 establishments in Illinois
2009 disestablishments in Illinois
Moline, Illinois
Rock Island County, Illinois
Sports teams in the Quad Cities